Randy Meisner is the third solo studio album (and the second self-titled) by Randy Meisner. It was released in mid 1982, on Epic in the United States, and in the United Kingdom. It is to-date Meisner's final solo album of original material. The album features a duet with Heart's lead vocalist, Ann Wilson.

Critical reception
etrospectively reviewing for AllMusic, critic Bruce Eder wrote that the album "is a gorgeous country-rock production with a hard electric edge in all the right places and soaring melodies throughout" and he added that, "There are pleasing guitar hooks throughout, and the album's mix of raw power and subtle lyricism has endured very well over the decades."

Track listing
"Never Been in Love" (Craig Bickhardt) - 4:26
"Darkness of the Heart" (David Palmer) - 4:18
"Jealousy" (Meisner, Dixon House, Howard Leese) - 4:55
"Tonight" (Bryan Adams, Jim Vallance) - 5:12
"Playin' in the Deep End" (Meisner, House) - 4:08
"Strangers" (Elton John, Gary Osborne) - 3:56
"Still Runnin'" (House, Leese) - 3:28
"Nothing Is Said ('Til the Artist Is Dead)" (Meisner, House) - 3:58
"Doin' It for Delilah" (John Corey) - 3:50

Personnel
Randy Meisner - bass guitar, guitar, lead and background vocals
Paul Buckmaster - string conductor
Denny Carmassi - drums
John Corey - guitar, piano, background vocals
Tom Erak - bass
Mitchell Froom - synthesizer
Dixon House - organ, piano, background vocals
Phil Kenzie - saxophone
Brian Smith - guitar, electric guitar
Howard Leese - synthesizer, guitar, electric guitar, background vocals
Marcy Levy - background vocals
Sterling Smith - organ, synthesizer, piano
Tower of Power - horn section
Ann Wilson - co-lead vocals on "Strangers"
Nancy Wilson - background vocals

Production
Producer: Mike Flicker
Engineers: Mike Flicker, Rolf Hennemann
Mixing: Mike Flicker, Rolf Hennemann
Mastering: Greg Fulginiti
Horn arrangements: Greg Adams
String arrangements: Paul Buckmaster
Vocal arrangement: John Corey, Dixon House
Art direction: Kosh
Design: Kosh
Photography: Henry Diltz, George Holz

References

Randy Meisner albums
1982 albums
Albums arranged by Paul Buckmaster
Albums produced by Mike Flicker
Epic Records albums